The 2009–10 Nebraska Cornhuskers men's basketball team represented the University of Nebraska, Lincoln in the 2009–10 college basketball season. Head coach Doc Sadler entered his 4th season at Nebraska. The Cornhuskers competed in the Big 12 Conference and played their home games at the Bob Devaney Sports Center. They finished with a record of 15-18 overall and 2-12 in Big 12 Conference play.  Nebraska defeated Missouri in the first round of the 2010 Big 12 men's basketball tournament before being eliminated by Texas A&M in the semifinals.

Roster

2009–10 Schedule and results
 
|-
!colspan=9| Exhibition

|-
!colspan=9| Regular Season

|-
!colspan=9| Phillips 66 2010 Big 12 men's basketball tournament

|-

References

Nebraska
Nebraska Cornhuskers men's basketball seasons
Corn
Corn